Ocellipsis is a genus of flies belonging to the family Lesser Dung flies.

Species
O. alutacea Richards, 1938
O. brunneicauda Richards, 1965
O. cyclogaster Richards, 1938
O. elgonensis Richards, 1957
O. humeralis Richards, 1965
O. jeanneli Richards, 1938
O. leleupi Richards, 1957
O. lonchomma Richards, 1938
O. melanocephala Richards, 1938
O. selaginella Richards, 1965
O. spinata Richards, 1957
O. verruciger Richards, 1938

References

Sphaeroceridae
Diptera of Africa
Brachycera genera